The 2011 Women's Futsal World Tournament was held in Fortaleza, Brazil from December 5 to December 10, 2011. It was the second World Tournament held under FIFA futsal rules. The venue was Ginásio Paulo Sarasate in Fortaleza.

Venues

Referees
 Marcelino Blazquez Sierra (Spain)
 Mario Fernando Lobo Silva (Portugal)
 Zelentsv Grigory (Russia)
 Shibamura Yoichi (Japan)
 Leonardo Taricani (Venezuela)
 Marcelo Bais (Argentina)
 Giselle Torri (Brazil)
 Katiucia Meneguzzi dos Santos (Brazil)
 Renata Neves Leite (Brazil)
 Alane Jussara da Silva Lucena (Brazil)

Officials
 Sumula On Line Operator: Madeline Chaves Cavalcante (Brazil)
 FIFA Refereeing Technical Director: Jesus Rubio Cano (Spain)
 CBFS Refereeing Director: Paraguassu Fisch de Figueiredo (Brazil)

Group stage

Group A

Group B

Play-off round

5th/8th places

1st/4th places

Final ranking

References

2011 in futsal
2011
2011
2011 in Brazilian football
2011
December 2011 sports events in South America